Černíč is a municipality and village in Jihlava District in the Vysočina Region of the Czech Republic. It has about 100 inhabitants.

Administrative parts
Villages of Myslůvka and Slaviboř are administrative parts of Černíč.

References

Villages in Jihlava District